Frederick James Eugene Woodbridge (March 26, 1867 – June 1, 1940) was a teacher at various American universities. Woodbridge considered himself a naïve realist, deeply impressed with Santayana.  He spent much of his career as a dean (of the Faculties of Political Science, Philosophy, and Pure Science) at Columbia University, where a residence hall and a professorship in philosophy are named in his honor. He was editor of the Journal of Philosophy, Psychology and Scientific Methods. David and Lillian Swenson, translators of some of the works of Søren Kierkegaard, dedicated Concluding Unscientific Postscript, (1941) to Professor Woodbridge.

Biography
He was born on March 26, 1867 in Windsor, Ontario to James Woodbridge and Melissa Ella Bingham. In 1869 his family moved to Kalamazoo, Michigan. In 1885 he enrolled at Amherst College where he studied philosophy and religion under Charles Edward Garman. He graduated from Amherst with an A.B. in 1889 and then he enrolled at the Union Theological Seminary. In 1892 he left Union on a fellowship and went to Germany to study philosophy at the Humboldt University of Berlin, where he received the Ph.D. He returned to the United States in 1894.  He took a teaching position at the University of Minnesota. He married Helena Belle Adams of Cincinnati, Ohio on June 25, 1895 in Chicago, Illinois.  They had 4 children, Frederick James Woodbridge, John Woodbridge, Donald Woodbridge, and Helena Woodbridge.

In 1902 Woodbridge left the University of Minnesota for New York City and a position at Columbia University. In 1904 he co-founded with James McKeen Cattell, The Journal of Philosophy, Psychology and Scientific Methods. Woodbridge taught philosophy at Columbia from 1902 until 1912 when he became the university's Dean of the Faculties of Political Science, Philosophy, and Pure Science. In 1929 he retired as Dean but continued to teach. He retired from teaching in 1937, but he continued to edit The Journal of Philosophy until his death in 1940.

He died on June 1, 1940 in Manhattan, New York City. His funeral was at St. Paul's Chapel.

Legacy 
Woodbridge Hall, a Columbia University dormitory located at 431 Riverside Drive, is named in his honor.

Works
The Purpose of History (1916)
The Realm of Mind (1926)
The Son of Apollo: Themes of Plato (1929)
Nature and Mind: Selected Essays (1937)
An Essay on Nature (1940)
Aristotle's Vision of Nature (ed. John H. Randall Jr., 1965)

References

External links 

 
 
 The Purpose of History Lectures delivered at University of North Carolina 1916
 Metaphysics Columbia University 1908
 Webpage on F.J.E. Woodbridge by J. A. Woodbridge

1867 births
1940 deaths
Columbia University faculty
20th-century American philosophers
People from Windsor, Ontario
People from Manhattan
Amherst College alumni
Humboldt University of Berlin alumni
Union Theological Seminary (New York City) alumni
University of Minnesota faculty